Naram in Iran may refer to:
 Naram, Mazandaran
 Naram, South Khorasan